Jasmin Siddiqui is a German-born multidisciplinary artist. She is popularly known as Hera.

Early, personal life and education
Siddiqui was born in Frankfurt, Germany in 1981. She was raised Catholic and Muslim, causing her to experience conflicts at school. She later coped with it as she came across graffiti.

Siddiqui has a classic art education that started at eight years old.

She studied Visual Communication and Graphic Design at the University of Applied Sciences in Wiesbaden.

Art
Siddiqui’s works are characterized by gestural brushstrokes and use of mythological scenes. She combines traditional techniques and spray painting to portray comical and satirical scenes. Her works often tackle the human condition, childhood, injustice, and social awareness. Each of her works has a corresponding text to accompany the image.

Herakut
In 2004, Siddiqui collaborated with graffiti artist Akut (Falk Lehmann) to form Herakut. Since 2004, the street art duo has exhibited in art fairs and galleries around the world, has created more than 100 public murals, published two books; and are in major collections around the world. Their works are characterized by their narrative style, use of drippy paint technique and imagination.

Selected works
Poetry Written in Fairy Language
An Ode To You
Love her but leave her wild 
There is as much to learn as here is to teach
Smart Rats Have a Thousand Lives
I guess letting go

References

Living people
1981 births
21st-century German artists
21st-century German women artists
Artists from Frankfurt
German graffiti artists
RheinMain University of Applied Sciences alumni